Peter Lee Complin (born 17 November 1984) is a speedway rider from England.

Speedway career
Complin began his British career riding for Sheffield Tigers during the 2001 Premier League speedway season. The following year he also rode for Belle Vue Aces in the top tier of British Speedway. In 2007, he joined Stoke Potters where he stayed for three seasons peaking with a 7.95 average and he also made appearances for both Peterborough Panthers and Wolverhampton Wolves during the 2009 Elite League speedway season.

He moved to the Berwick Bandits for the 2010 and 2011 seasons before leaving speedway for nearly ten years.

In 2021, he made a surprise comeback and signed for Newcastle Diamonds for the SGB Championship 2022 but Newcastle folded in June resulting in Complin signing for Plymouth Gladiators in August and he finished the 2022 season with them.

In 2023, he signed for Glasgow Tigers for the SGB Championship 2023 and signed for Mildenhall Fen Tigers for the 2023 NDL.

References 

1984 births
Living people
British speedway riders
Belle Vue Aces riders
Berwick Bandits riders
Glasgow Tigers riders
Mildenhall Fen Tigers riders
Newcastle Diamonds riders
Peterborough Panthers riders
Plymouth Gladiators speedway riders
Sheffield Tigers riders
Stoke Potters riders
Wolverhampton Wolves riders